The Healing Game is the twenty-sixth studio album by Northern Irish singer-songwriter Van Morrison, released in 1997 by Polydor. It reached the Top Ten in four countries, and the Top Twenty in three more. Following two overtly jazz albums, it saw Morrison adding blues and a pop sensibility. It is the only album recorded after 1980 which Rolling Stone judged to be among his ten best, calling it "a clear highlight of his mid-period discography".

Recording history
The album was recorded in Dublin, Ireland, in 1996. The cover shows Morrison with Haji Ahkba.

Songs
The title song is about the tradition of Belfast street singing. Van Morrison told Q magazine, "People find it incredible when I tell them that people used to sing and play music in the street", adding that "there's a whole oral tradition that's disappeared." "Rough God Goes Riding" is taken from a W. B. Yeats poem "The Second Coming" with the "rough beast" from the Apocalypse, and features Leo Green's saxophone following Morrison's voice. In "Waiting Game" Morrison is "the brother of the snake", which Brian Hinton says refers to both his lost friend Jim Morrison (known for writing about "The Lizard King"), and the Garden of Eden. "Piper at the Gates of Dawn" echoes the children's book, The Wind in the Willows, and features Paddy Moloney on uillean pipes with Phil Coulter on piano.  On "Burning Ground", Morrison references his childhood when jute was shipped to Belfast from India.

Reception

Music critic Greil Marcus was impressed, writing that, "[like] the rough god he sings about, Morrison is astride each incident in the music, each pause in a greater story," but advises close listening, as "often the most revealing moments —the moments that reveal the shape of a world, a point of view, an argument about life — are at the margins."  Reviewing the 2019 reissue, All About Jazz asserted that "Healing Game is one of most complete personal and musical statements in Van Morrison's lengthy discography." It saw the artist "revisit the jazz and rhythm and blues-inspired style that influenced his earliest work", having "assembled a killer new band"

Reissues
The 2008 remastered version of the album contains a bonus track: "At the End of the Day", which was the a B-side of "Rough God Goes Riding", the third single of the album, which itself was listed as one of the standout tracks from Van Morrison's six album reissue series. The album was reissued again in 2019 as a triple CD, with bonus material from the studio sessions and Van Morrison's performance at the Montreux Jazz Festival on 17 July 1997. Disc two featured collaborations with John Lee Hooker, Carl Perkins and British skiffle star Lonnie Donegan.

Track listing
All songs by Van Morrison, except where noted.

2019 deluxe edition

Personnel

Musicians
Van Morrison – vocals, acoustic guitar, harmonica
John Lee Hooker: vocals on Don't Look Back and The Healing Game (disc 2 version)
Carl Perkins: vocals on Boppin' the Blues, Matchbox, Sitting on Top of the World, My Angel and All by Myself
Lonnie Donegan: vocals on Mule Skinner Blues
Ronnie Johnson – electric guitar
Peter O'Hanlon – dobro on "Piper at the Gates of Dawn" and "At the End of the Day"
Nicky Scott – bass guitar
Alec Dankworth – double bass
Robin Aspland – piano
Phil Coulter – piano on "Piper at the Gates of Dawn" and "At the End of the Day"
Georgie Fame – Hammond organ, background vocals
Pee Wee Ellis – soprano and baritone saxophones, background vocals
Leo Green – tenor saxophone, background vocals
Haji Ahkba – flugelhorn
Paddy Moloney – uilleann pipes and tin whistle on "Piper at the Gates of Dawn"
Matt Holland – trumpet, background vocals
Brian Kennedy – background vocals
Katie Kissoon – background vocals
Geoff Dunn – drums, percussion
Ralph Salmins – percussion

Production
Production: Van Morrison
Recording: Walter Samuel, Enda Walsh ("Piper at the Gates of Dawn", "At the End of the Day")
Assistant engineering: David Slevin, Ciaran Cahill, Matthew Lawrence anad Neil Douglas
Mixing: Walter Samuel
Technical support: David Conroy
Mastering: Tim Young
Art direction and design: Matt Curtis @ Abrahams Pants
Photography: Paul Cox

Charts
Album – UK Album Chart

Album – Billboard (North America)

Certifications

Notes

References
Hinton, Brian (1997). Celtic Crossroads: The Art of Van Morrison, Sanctuary, 
Marcus, Greil (2010).  When That Rough God Goes Riding: Listening to Van Morrison, Public Affairs,

External links
Greil Marcus Review: The Healing Game

Van Morrison albums
1997 albums
Mercury Records albums
Polydor Records albums
Albums produced by Van Morrison